Peninsula Nursing and Rehabilitation Center, formerly known as Rockaway Beach Hospital and Peninsula General Hospital, was a community hospital in the Far Rockaway neighborhood of Queens, New York. PHC, founded in 1908,
which opened on April 30, 1911, was an affiliate of the MediSys Health Network at the time of its 2012 closure.

History
The hospital expanded in 1960. In 1964, then still known as "Peninsula General Hospital in Edgemere, Queens," they built a supplementary 2-story structure primarily for nurses quarters. In the 1970s Peninsula attempted to take over another hospital.

PHC ran a 173-bed acute care community teaching hospital campus, and a 200-bed long-term care and rehabilitation center, serving the communities of the Rockaways, the Five Towns of Nassau County and parts of Queens and Brooklyn.

Peninsula, which in 2006 a state agency wanted St. Johns to absorb,
closed in 2012.

Since 2014 the facility has been known as Peninsula Nursing and Rehabilitation Center operated by Cassena Care.

Services
Peninsula Nursing and Rehabilitation Center offered the following medical services:

Medical staff residency training records and Verifications have become available through the Federation Credentials Verification Service (FCVS) Closed Residency program records.

Auxiliary services
Nursing Home: Attached to the hospital is a 200-bed facility known as the Peninsula Center for Extended Care and Rehabilitation (PCECR).

Family Health Center: This facility offered comprehensive outpatient care for all ages.

References

External links

 

Hospital buildings completed in 1908
Defunct hospitals in Queens
1908 establishments in New York City
2012 disestablishments in New York (state)
Rockaway, Queens
Hospitals disestablished in 2012